The 2005 Supercupa României was the 8th edition of Romania's season opener cup competition. The match was played in Bucharest at Stadionul Cotroceni on 31 July 2005, and was contested between Divizia A title holders, Steaua and Cupa României champions, Dinamo. Dinamo won the trophy.

Match

Details

References

External links
Romania - List of Super Cup Finals, RSSSF.com

Super
2005
Supercupa României
Supercupa Romaniei 2006